Germanwings Flight 9525 was a scheduled international passenger flight from Barcelona–El Prat Airport in Spain to Düsseldorf Airport in Germany. The flight was operated by Germanwings, a low-cost carrier owned by the German airline Lufthansa. All 144 passengers and all six crew members were killed. It was the only fatal crash involving a Germanwings aircraft during the company's 18 years in operation.

The crash was deliberately caused by the co-pilot, Andreas Lubitz, who had previously been treated for suicidal tendencies and declared unfit to work by his doctor. Lubitz kept this information from his employer and instead reported for duty. Shortly after reaching cruise altitude and while the captain was out of the cockpit, Lubitz locked the cockpit door and initiated a controlled descent that continued until the aircraft hit a mountainside.

Aviation authorities swiftly implemented new recommendations from the European Union Aviation Safety Agency that required two authorised personnel in the cockpit at all times but, by 2017, Germanwings and other German airlines had dropped the rule.

The Lubitz family held a press conference in March 2017 during which Lubitz's father said that they did not accept the official investigative findings that his son deliberately caused the crash. By 2017, Lufthansa had paid €75,000 to the family of every victim, as well as €10,000 in pain and suffering compensation to every close relative of a victim.

Flight

Germanwings Flight 9525 took off from Runway 07R at Barcelona–El Prat Airport on  2015 at 10:01 am CET (09:01 UTC), 26 minutes behind schedule. It was due to arrive at Düsseldorf Airport by 11:39 CET. According to the French national civil aviation inquiries bureau, the Bureau of Enquiry and Analysis for Civil Aviation Safety (BEA), the pilots confirmed instructions from French air traffic control at 10:30 CET. 

The air traffic controller declared the aircraft in distress after its descent and loss of radio contact.

The descent time from 38,000 ft was about 10 minutes; radar observed an average descent rate around 3,400 ft/min. Attempts by French air traffic control to contact the flight on the assigned radio frequency were not answered. A French military Mirage jet was scrambled from the Orange-Caritat Air Base to intercept the aircraft. A seismological station of the Sismalp network, the Grenoble Observatory,  from the crash site, recorded the associated seismic event, determining the impact time as 10:41:05 CET.

The crash was the deadliest air disaster in France since the 1981 crash of Inex-Adria Aviopromet Flight 1308, in which 180 people died, and the third-deadliest French air disaster of all time, behind Flight 1308 and Turkish Airlines Flight 981. This was the first major crash of a civil airliner in France since that of Concorde flight Air France Flight 4590 on take off from Charles de Gaulle Airport in 2000.

Crash site

The aircraft was travelling at  when it struck the mountain.

Gendarmerie nationale and Sécurité Civile sent helicopters to locate the wreckage. The aircraft had disintegrated; the largest piece of wreckage was the size of a car. A helicopter landed near the crash site; its personnel confirmed no survivors. The search and rescue team reported the debris field covered .

Aircraft
The aircraft involved was a 24-year-old Airbus A320-211, serial number 147, registered as D-AIPX. It made its first flight on  1990 and was delivered to Lufthansa on  1991. The aircraft was leased to Germanwings from  2003 until mid-2004, then returned to Lufthansa on  2004 and remained with the airline until it was transferred to Germanwings again on  2014. The aircraft had accumulated about 58,300 flight hours on 46,700 flights.

Crew and passengers

During its final flight, the aircraft was carrying 144 passengers and six crew (two pilots and four cabin crew members) from at least 18 countries—mostly Germany and Spain. The count was confused by the multiple citizenship status of some people on board.

Crew
The flight's pilot in command was 34-year-old Captain Patrick Sondenheimer, who had 10 years' experience (6,000 flight hours, including 3,811 hours on the Airbus A320) flying A320s for Germanwings, Lufthansa, and Condor. The co-pilot was 27-year-old Andreas Lubitz, who joined Germanwings in September 2013 and had 630 flying hours, 540 of them on the Airbus A320.

Andreas Lubitz
Andreas Günter Lubitz was born on 18 December 1987 and grew up in Neuburg an der Donau, Bavaria, and Montabaur in the German state of Rhineland-Palatinate. He took flying lessons at Luftsportclub Westerwald, an aviation sports club in Montabaur.

Lubitz was accepted into a Lufthansa trainee programme after finishing high school. In September 2008, he began training at the Lufthansa Flight Training school in Bremen, Germany. He suspended his pilot training in November 2008 after being hospitalised for a severe episode of depression. After his psychiatrist determined that the depressive episode was fully resolved, Lubitz returned to the Lufthansa school in August 2009. Lubitz moved to the United States in November 2010 to continue training at the Lufthansa Airline Training Center in Goodyear, Arizona. From June 2011 to December 2013, he worked as a flight attendant for Lufthansa while training to obtain his commercial pilot's licence, and joined Germanwings as a first officer in June 2014.

Passengers
Among the passengers were 16 students and 2 teachers from the Joseph-König-Gymnasium of Haltern am See, North Rhine-Westphalia. They were returning home from a student exchange with the Giola Institute in Llinars del Vallès, Barcelona. Haltern's mayor, Bodo Klimpel, described the crash as "the darkest day in the history of [the] town". Bass-baritone Oleg Bryjak and contralto Maria Radner, singers with Deutsche Oper am Rhein, were also on the flight.

Investigation
The French Bureau of Enquiry and Analysis for Civil Aviation Safety (BEA) opened an investigation into the crash; it was joined by its German counterpart, the Federal Bureau of Aircraft Accident Investigation (BFU). The BEA investigation was led by Arnaud Desjardin and was assisted by the United States Federal Bureau of Investigation. Hours after the crash, the BEA sent seven investigators to the site; these were accompanied by representatives from Airbus and CFM International. The cockpit voice recorder, which was damaged but still usable, was recovered by rescue workers and examined by the investigation team. The following week, Brice Robin, the government prosecutor based in Marseille, announced that the flight data recorder, blackened by fire but still usable, had also been found. Investigators isolated 150 sets of DNA, which were compared with the DNA of the victims' families.

Cause of crash
According to French and German prosecutors, the crash was deliberately caused by the co-pilot, Andreas Lubitz. Robin said Lubitz was courteous to Captain Sondenheimer during the first part of the flight, then became "curt" when the captain began the midflight briefing on the planned landing. Robin said that when the captain left the cockpit, possibly to use the toilet, Lubitz locked the door, preventing anyone from entering. The captain had a code to unlock the door, but the lock's code panel could be disabled from the cockpit controls. The captain requested re-entry using the intercom; he knocked and then banged on the door, but received no response. The captain then tried to break down the door, but like most cockpit doors made after the September 11 attacks, it had been reinforced to prevent intrusion. During the descent, the co-pilot did not respond to questions from Marseille air traffic control, nor did he transmit a distress call. Robin said contact from the air traffic control tower, the captain's attempts to break in, and Lubitz's steady breathing were audible on the cockpit voice recording. The screams of passengers in the last moments before impact were also heard on the recording.

After their initial analysis of the aircraft's flight data recorder, the BEA concluded that Lubitz had made flight control inputs that led to the crash. The BEA preliminary report into the crash was published six weeks later, on 6 May 2015. It confirmed the initial analysis of the aircraft's flight data recorder and revealed that during the earlier outbound Flight 9524 from Düsseldorf to Barcelona, Lubitz had practised setting the autopilot altitude dial to 100 ft several times while the captain was out of the cockpit.

The BEA final report into the crash was published on 13 March 2016. The report confirmed the findings made in the preliminary report and concluded that Lubitz had deliberately crashed the aircraft as a suicide. The report stated:

Investigation of Lubitz
Three days after the crash, German detectives searched Lubitz's Montabaur properties and removed a computer and other items for testing. They did not find a suicide note nor any evidence his actions had been motivated by "a political or religious background". During their search of Lubitz's apartment, detectives found a letter written by a doctor indicating Lubitz had been declared unfit to work. Germanwings stated it had not received a sick note from Lubitz for the day of the flight. News accounts said Lubitz was "hiding an illness from his employers". Under German law, employers do not have access to employees' medical records, and sick notes excusing people from work do not give information about medical conditions, so employers must rely on employees to declare their lack of work fitness.

The following day, authorities again searched Lubitz's home where they found evidence he suffered from a psychosomatic illness and was taking prescription drugs. Criminal investigators said Lubitz's web searches on his tablet computer in the days leading up to the crash included "ways to commit suicide" and "cockpit doors and their security provisions". Robin said doctors had told him Lubitz should not have been flying, but medical secrecy requirements prevented his physician from making this information available to Germanwings. Such secrecy should consider public safety, said BEA investigator Arnaud Desjardin.

The investigation into Lubitz found he had been treated for suicidal tendencies prior to his training as a commercial pilot and had been temporarily denied a US pilot's licence because of these treatments for psychotic depression. For years, Lubitz had frequently been unable to sleep because of what he believed were vision problems; he consulted over 40 doctors and feared he was going blind. Motivated by the fear that blindness would cause him to lose his pilot's licence, he began conducting online research about methods of committing suicide before deciding to crash Flight 9525.

Aftermath

Political

French Minister of the Interior Bernard Cazeneuve announced that due to the "violence of the impact", "little hope" existed that any survivors would be found. Then-Prime Minister Manuel Valls dispatched Cazeneuve to the scene and set up a ministerial task force to coordinate the response to the incident.

German Foreign Minister Frank-Walter Steinmeier flew over the crash site, describing it as "a picture of horror". German Chancellor Angela Merkel and the minister-president of North Rhine-Westphalia Hannelore Kraft travelled to the crash site the following day. Merkel, Valls, and Spanish Prime Minister Mariano Rajoy visited the recovery operations base at Seyne-les-Alpes. Bodo Klimpel, mayor of Haltern am See, reacting to the deaths of 16 students and 2 teachers from the town, said that people were shocked by the crash.

Commercial

Lufthansa chief executive officer Carsten Spohr visited the crash location the day following the crash; he said it was "the darkest day for Lufthansa in its 60-year history". Several Germanwings flights were cancelled on 24 and 25 March due to the pilots' grief at the loss of their colleagues. Germanwings retired the flight number 4U9525, changing it to 4U9441; the outbound flight number was changed from 4U9524 to 4U9440. In the days following the crash, Lufthansa at first said it saw no reason to change its procedures, then reversed its earlier statement by introducing a new policy across its airlines requiring the presence of two crew members in the cockpit at all times.

Regulatory
In response to the incident and the circumstances of the co-pilot's involvement, aviation authorities in some countries implemented new regulations that require the presence of two authorised personnel in the cockpit at all times. Three days after the incident, the European Aviation Safety Agency issued a temporary recommendation for airlines to ensure that at least two crew members—including at least one pilot—were in the cockpit for the entire duration of the flight. Several airlines announced that they had already adopted similar policies voluntarily. But by 2016, the EASA stopped recommending the two-person rule, instead advising airlines to perform a risk assessment and decide for themselves whether to implement it. Germanwings and other German airlines dropped the procedure in 2017.

The British Psychological Society issued a statement offering expert support in psychological testing and monitoring of pilots. The European Federation of Psychologists' Associations issued a statement supporting psychological testing in the selection of pilots, but also stated it could not forecast the life events and mental health problems of individual pilots, nor could it predict the unique ways pilots would cope with these. It said priority should be given to psychological help for relatives and friends of victims in the aftermath of a disaster. CEO Spohr proposed random checks of pilots' psychological fitness and a loosening of the extant physician–patient confidentiality laws. Politicians began echoing the call to loosen the laws in exceptional cases. 

The national police force in France, the National Gendarmerie, introduced a new set of support mechanisms to minimise the psychosocial risks to relief workers who deal with events such as Flight 9525 in their daily jobs.

Compensation and litigation
Germanwings' parent company Lufthansa offered victims' families an initial aid payment up to €50,000, separate from any legally required compensation for the disaster. Elmar Giemulla, a professor of aviation law at the Technical University of Berlin quoted by the Rheinische Post, said he expected the airline would pay a total of €10–30 million in compensation. The Montreal Convention sets a per-victim cap of €143,000 in the event an airline is held liable, unless negligence can be proven. Insurance specialists said although co-pilot Andreas Lubitz hid a serious illness from his employer and deliberately crashed the passenger aircraft, these facts would not affect the issue of compensation nor be applicable to the exclusion clause in Lufthansa's insurance policy. Lufthansa's insurance company set aside US$300 million (€280 million) for financial compensation to victims' families and for the cost of the aircraft. By 2017, Lufthansa had paid €75,000 to the family of every victim, as well as €10,000 in pain and suffering compensation to every close relative of a victim. 

Victim families sued the Lufthansa Airline Training Center in Arizona to obtain higher compensation, but the case was reverted to German courts in March 2017. In July 2020, a court in Essen ruled against several victim families, holding that neither Lufthansa nor the training centre in Arizona could be held liable. Flight doctors who may have negligently authorised Lubitz to fly were working on behalf of the German government's flight authority, the Luftfahrt-Bundesamt. The ruling was upheld on appeal in September 2021. In November 2021, a coroner's inquest into the deaths of two British victims concluded with a verdict of unlawful killing.

Commemorative

Shortly after the crash, a memorial stone in memory of the victims was erected near the crash site in Le Vernet. The following month, about 1,400 relatives of victims, senior politicians, rescue workers, and airline employees attended a memorial service at Cologne Cathedral. The parents of Andreas Lubitz were invited to the service but did not attend.

The remains of 15 of the 16 school children and their two teachers arrived in their home town of Haltern for burial two months after the crash. Residents held white roses as the hearses passed the children's school, where 18 trees—one for each victim—had been planted as a memorial. In Düsseldorf on the same day, the remains of 44 of the 72 German victims arrived for burial. Errors on the victims' death certificates had caused a delay.

In September 2017, a sculpture called Sonnenkugel ("Sunsphere") was installed at the site of the crash. The sculpture consists of 149 gold-coloured aluminium plates which form a sphere around a crystal-shaped column. The column holds 149 wooden spheres, which in turn hold personal mementos provided by the victims' family members.

Second anniversary
The Lubitz family held a press conference on 24 March 2017, two years after the crash. Lubitz's father said the family did not accept the official investigative findings that Andreas Lubitz deliberately caused the crash or that he had been depressed at the time. Aviation journalist Tim van Beveren published a report which asserted that Lubitz could have fallen unconscious, that the cockpit door lock had malfunctioned on previous flights, and that potentially dangerous turbulence had been reported in the area on the day of the crash. Van Beveren had been commissioned by the family and was present at the press conference. The timing of the press conference by Lubitz's father, on the anniversary of the crash, was criticised by families of the victims, who were holding their own remembrances on that day.

Dramatisation
The crash was dramatised in season 16  of the Canadian TV series Mayday in an episode entitled "Murder in the Skies". The episode aired on 24 January 2017.

See also
 List of declared or suspected pilot suicides
 List of accidents and incidents involving the Airbus A320 family
 List of aircraft accidents and incidents resulting in at least 50 fatalities

Notes

References

External links

Official memorial website – Lufthansa Group
 memorial site (also by Lufthansa Group)
 
 
 

2015 in France
2015 in Spain
2015 in Germany
Accidents and incidents involving Germanwings (Deutsche Lufthansa AG)
Accidents and incidents involving the Airbus A320
Airliner accidents and incidents involving deliberate crashes
Alpes-de-Haute-Provence
Aviation accidents and incidents in 2015
Aviation accidents and incidents in France
France–Germany relations
France–Spain relations
Germany–Spain relations
History of the Alps
March 2015 events in Europe
Mental health in Germany
Lufthansa
March 2015 events in France
March 2015 events in Spain
March 2015 events in Germany